Chua En Lai (born 25 November 1979) is a Singaporean actor, comedian and host, best known for his work on the Mediacorp Channel 5 sitcom The Noose. He left Mediacorp due to his contract expiry.

Early life
Chua was born in Singapore and raised in New Zealand. He lived in New Zealand for 12 years before moving back to Singapore. He has also expressed an interest in singing, having joined the Singapore Armed Forces Choir.

Career
Chua has worked on over 30 theatre productions with groups such as Wild Rice!, Toy Factory, Spell#7, SRT, TheatreWorks, The Necessary Stage and Action Theatre. On television, Chua is known for his roles as B.B.See (See Beh Biang) and Jacques Ooi in the Mediacorp Channel 5 sitcom The Noose. Chua has worked with Krishen Jit on several productions, including Squeeze & Squeezability, Plunge and The Visit of the Tai Tai.

In 2011, Chua starred as a platoon commander in The Ghosts Must Be Crazy, a two-part comedy horror film directed by Mark Lee and Boris Boo. Chua has also made a cameo as a police officer in the comedy movie Taxi! Taxi!, directed by Kelvin Sng and starring Gurmit Singh and Mark Lee.

Chua is also a member of the Association of Singapore Actors. In 2013, Chua expressed an interest in moving to more dramatic roles.

Despite his over the top acting and slapstick brand of humour, Chua has managed to find much success in the local market.

Chua is currently managed by FLY Entertainment and is currently the ambassador for HealthHub's campaign.

Filmography

Theatre

Awards and nominations

References 

Living people
Singaporean male actors
Singaporean people of Chinese descent
1979 births